Golden Grove was launched at Southampton in 1783, but probably under another name. In 1794 she was a slave ship. Under new ownership she wrecked in late 1795.

Career
Although Golden Grove was launched in 1783, she does not appear in Lloyd's Register until 1793. At that time her master was Proudfoot, her owner was (Richard) Miles, and her trade was London–Africa.

Captain John Mead Proudfoot received a letter of marque on 8 October 1793. Golden Grove left London on 7 November 1793, bound for Bight of Benin.

Proudfood commenced gathering slaves on 18 January 1794. She gathered them at Cape Coast Castle, Anomabu, and Popo. Golden Grove sailed from Africa on 14 April, and arrived at Kingston, Jamaica, on 5 June. She had embarked 416 slaves and she landed 415, having suffered only one slave death en route, an astonishingly low death toll for the route. She arrived back in England on 3 October.

Lloyd's Register for 1796 shows Golden Groves master changing from Proudfoot to "W. H_dg__n", her owner to Wood, and her trade to London—"StK__ts".

Fate
A Golden Grove was wrecked on 18 November 1795 at Chesil Beach, Dorset. Lloyd's List reported on 20 November that Golden Grove, Hodzard, master, was wrecked on Portland Beach on her way to St Kitts, and that very little of her cargo was saved. (Golden Grove is no longer listed in Lloyd's Register in 1796.)

Golden Grove was one of seven vessels wrecked in the same storm. At the time, Golden Grove and at least five of the other vessels that were wrecked were part of Admiral Christian's fleet that was sailing to capture islands in the West Indies. The British fleet did not leave Spithead until 16 November; two days after departing, a westerly gale blew up, dispersing the fleet and driving the ships back to port. Several of the merchantmen, Golden Grove among them,  were wrecked with heavy loss of life; over 200 bodies were washed up on the coastline between Portland and Bridport.

The expeditionary force finally sailed between  mid-February and mid-March. In May–June the British succeeded in capturing St Lucia, Saint Vincent, and Grenada.

Notes

Citations

References
 
 

1783 ships
London slave ships
Age of Sail merchant ships
Merchant ships of the United Kingdom
Maritime incidents in 1795